The first Parkes ministry was the fourteenth ministry of the Colony of New South Wales, and the first of five occasions of being led by Henry Parkes.

Having served in the New South Wales Legislative Council between 1854 and 1856, Parkes was elected in the first free elections for the New South Wales Legislative Assembly held in 1856, however resigned from Parliament later that year. He served in the Assembly on several occasions, between 1858 and 1870, being forced to resign on 4 occasions due to his personal insolvency. He came to power as Premier on the first occasion after the Sir James Martin ministry had involved itself in a petty squabble with the colony of Victoria over a question of border duties. The acting-governor had sent for William Forster before parliament met, but he was unable to form a ministry, and in May 1872 Parkes formed his first ministry.

The title of Premier was widely used to refer to the Leader of Government, but not enshrined in formal use until 1920.

There was no party system in New South Wales politics until 1887. Under the constitution, ministers were required to resign to recontest their seats in a by-election when appointed. A poll was required for East Sydney (Henry Parkes) and Newcastle (George Lloyd), both of whom were comfortably re-elected. The five other ministers, Edward Butler (Argyle), James Farnell (Parramatta), Joseph Innes (Mudgee), William Piddington (The Hawkesbury) and John Sutherland (Paddington), were re-elected unopposed. Polls were subsequently required on the appointment of George Allen (Glebe) and Robert Abbott (Tenterfield) but each were comfortably re-elected.

The ministry created two new ministerial roles, Minister of Justice and Public Instruction in 1873 and the Secretary for Mines in 1874. The office of Solicitor General became dormant in 1873 when the Attorney General, Edward Butler. resigned and Solicitor General Joseph Innes was appointed Attorney General.

This ministry covers the period from 14 May 1872 until 8 February 1875, when Parkes lost the confidence of the Assembly following Governor Robinson's decision to release the bushranger Frank Gardiner, resulting in the defeat of the ministry.

Composition of ministry

Ministers are members of the Legislative Assembly unless otherwise noted.

See also

Self-government in New South Wales

References

 

New South Wales ministries
1872 establishments in Australia
1875 disestablishments in Australia